Walter Chikowski (November 23, 1915 – June 30, 1994) was a Canadian football player who played for the Calgary Stampeders and Winnipeg Blue Bombers. He won the Grey Cup with the Stampeders in 1948. He played junior football in Winnipeg and was a veteran of the Royal Canadian Air Force in World War II. He died in 1994.

References

1915 births
1994 deaths
Players of Canadian football from Manitoba
Canadian football ends
Calgary Stampeders players
Winnipeg Blue Bombers players
Royal Canadian Air Force personnel of World War II